The Honda CR-X (styled in some markets as Honda CRX), originally launched as the Honda Ballade Sports CR-X in Japan, is a front-wheel-drive sport compact car manufactured by Honda from 1983 until 1991.  The first generation CRX was marketed in some regions outside Japan as the Honda Civic CRX.  Although there are many supposed definitions for the acronym CR-X, the most widely accepted is "Civic Renaissance Experimental".

In the U.S., the CRX was marketed as an economy sport Kammback with room for two passengers while Japanese and European market cars came with a 2+2 seating arrangement.  Redesigned for the 1988 model year and produced until 1991, the CRX was popular for its performance, nimble handling, and good fuel economy. The CR-X was replaced by Honda's CR-X del Sol and was marketed as a CR-X in some markets.



First generation

Overview
In 1983 for the 1984 model year, Honda introduced an all-new two-seater that shared the drivetrain with the Civic but offered unique styling and interior furnishings. At its introduction, the CR-X was available in Japan through Honda Verno dealership sales channels, and accompanied the Vigor, the Quint, and the Prelude.  In North America, the CRX was marketed in two versions: economy and sport.  The economy model used a new aluminum 1.3-liter CVCC 4-cylinder engine. The sport model featured an aluminum 1.5-liter 12-valve 4-cylinder engine and available with a 5-speed manual or 3-speed automatic transmission.

For 1985, Honda replaced the economy model with an HF (high fuel) model featuring a 1.5-liter engine which uses an aluminum block but the 1984 CVCC cylinder head (two valves per cylinder) instead of the new aluminum head with three valves per cylinder. In spring 1985, Honda introduced an Si (Sports, injected) model featuring a more powerful 1.5-liter SOHC PGM-FI 4-cylinder engine. The Si model included a power sunroof, standard dual remote exterior mirrors, rear wiper, 13-inch alloy wheels and an Si-exclusive ducktail spoiler for the hatch.

For 1986, Honda updated the CRX with new aerodynamic headlights. The Si received body color matched lower cladding, a revised rear spoiler, new bumper covers and 14-inch alloy wheels. The interior was upgraded and added a center console with cassette tape storage.  1987 was virtually unchanged from 1986 and would be the final year of the first-generation CRX.

Inspiration
The CR-X design was inspired by the Alfa Romeo GT Junior Zagato which the Honda CR-X designer owned.

Japanese and European market drivetrain
Though similar versions of the same engine, the Japanese Si engine was stamped ZC, while the European engine was stamped ZC1.
Japanese buyers took advantage of the largest, 1.5 L, engine while still paying the same amount of annual road tax.

Fuel economy
The later 1.5-liter American-market CRX HF (high fuel economy) model (chassis codes EC1 and AF) could also reliably achieve very good gas mileage, more than a decade before gas-electric hybrids appeared on the market, and at no price premium over the base model; the 1.5-liter is rated by the U.S. Environmental Protection Agency (EPA) (under the new rating system) at  city and  highway.

U.S. model curb weights

Second generation
{{Infobox automobile
| name = Second generation
| image = 88-91 CRX.jpg
| caption = 1988–1991 Honda CR-X
| production = 1987–1991
| model_years = 1988–1991
| engine = 1.5 L 62 hp D15B6 I4 (1988–89) 72 hp D15B6 I4 (1990–91)1.5 L 92 hp D15B2 I41.5 L 103 hp D15B1.6 L 105 HP D16A6 I4 (1988)1.6 L 108 hp D16A6 I4 (1989–91)1.4 L D14A1 I41.6 L 130 hp  I41.6 L 120hp D16A8 I41.6 L 125-129hp D16A9 I41.6 L 130 hp D16ZC I41.6 L VTEC 150-160 hp B16A1 I4
| transmission = 5-speed manual4-speed automatic (base model only)
| wheelbase = 
| length =  (1990–91) (1988–89)
| width =  (1990–91) (1988–89)
| height =  (1990–91) (1988–89)
| weight = 
}}

Overview

The Honda CR-X was completely redesigned by late 1987 for the 1988 model year. The suspension was completely redesigned. Honda abandoned the original torsion bar in the front and beam axle with trailing link in the rear in favor of a 4-wheel double-wishbone suspension. The larger design and revised suspension brought improvements in handling as well passenger and cargo space versus the previous generation.

The CR-X received a mild refresh for the 1990 model year. The VTEC equipped models also received a makeover with updated bumpers, lights, hood, brakes, suspension and dashboard design amongst other features. Additionally, some of these design changes were added to the concurrent non-VTEC models.

One of the options for the Japanese Domestic Market (JDM) CR-X was a glass roof, a fixed glass panel which stretched from the top of the windshield to the top of the hatch opening. Relatively common in Japan, these are sought-after models in other markets.

Japanese and European market drivetrain
Outside of North America, the second generation CR-X was available with a 1.5-litre SOHC 4-cylinder engine or an updated version of the 1.6-litre DOHC 4-cylinder (ZC) engine. Many of these were fitted with fuel injection as standard.

In September 1989, Honda added the 1.6-litre 16-valve DOHC VTEC 4-cylinder B16A engine to the lineup outside of North America. The VTEC (variable valve timing and lift electronic control) engine provided increased power at high RPMs while still allowing low fuel consumption and better idling at low RPMs. The CR-X was the second car to receive a DOHC VTEC engine, shortly after the Honda Integra XSi.

The CR-X equipped with the 1.6-litre DOHC 4-cylinder engine or the 1.6-litre DOHC VTEC 4-cylinder engine came with a different bonnet since the twin-cam engines were taller and required additional bonnet clearances in comparison to the SOHC engines.  The 1.6-litre DOHC engine was only slightly taller than the 1.6-litre SOHC engine and required a different bonnet with a bump on one side which offered the additional necessary clearance to clear the cam gear cover.  Cars equipped with a 1.6-litre DOHC VTEC 4-cylinder engine came with a bonnet that was raised across most of the engine bay to offer additional overall clearance for the taller engine.

In some LHD European markets, there was also the option of the D14A1 engine with automatic gearbox which featured twin carbs and no PGMFI.

US market
In the US, three different trim levels were available: The standard (unlabeled, sometimes called the "DX") equipped with the 1.5-liter 16-valve dual-point fuel injection 4-cylinder D15B2 engine, the HF ("high fuel efficiency") model with the 1.5-liter 8-valve multi-point fuel injection (MPFI) 4-cylinder D15B6 engine, or the Si (sport injected) model with the 1.6-liter 16-valve MPFI 4-cylinder D16A6 engine. The base model was available with either a 5-speed manual transmission or a 4-speed automatic transmission while the HF and Si only offered a 5-speed manual transmission. A modification made to the rear on all second generation vehicles is a heavily stippled black glass panel installed on the upper half of the rear of the vehicle, above the tail lights which aided in rearward visibility.

Features and equipment
Air conditioning was a dealer-installed option on all models.  The Si model came with a power sliding sunroof, a rear wiper and 14-inch alloy wheels.  Underneath, the Si model was equipped with a rear anti-sway bar along with variable ratio rack-and-pinion steering.  The 90-91 Si models had 4-wheel disc brakes.

Colors and trim
There were a total of six colors offered each model year.  Four color options were available on the CRX and CRX Si and two color options were available for the CRX HF.  Color availability would vary based on trim package and the interior color would depend on the exterior color choice.

Model updates
1988
First year of the second-generation CRX.

1989
Si and base model (DX) change to door-mounted seatbelts to comply with federal regulations.  Revision due to automatic seatbelt requirements.

1990
Minor changes to headlights, bumpers and taillights.
Instrument cover is now slightly more rounded.
Hazard switch relocated to the dashboard.
Si models now come equipped with four-wheel disc brakes.
Si models receive updated 14-inch alloy wheels.
Blade Silver color is discontinued and replaced by Polar white.

1991
Barbados yellow color is replaced by Tahitian green on the Si model.
Polar white color is replaced by Frost white.
Final year of the second-generation CRX.

Production by model year
												

Curb weights

Third generation

In 1992, Honda replaced the CR-X with a new, targa topped, Civic-based model called the Honda CR-X del Sol. The CR-X del Sol was also badged as the Civic del Sol and later the del Sol in some markets, and known simply as the CR-X in others. It is because of this that the del Sol is generally considered the "third generation CR-X" among enthusiasts.  In the United States, the del Sol came in three trim lines: S (VXi in Japan, later VGi), Si (ESi in Europe), and VTEC (VTi in Europe); the JDM SiR model featured a 1.6-liter  B16 SiR-II DOHC VTEC 4-cylinder engine. Production of the del Sol ended in 1997 in North America, elsewhere in 1998 and thus, the CR-X line was retired.

Comparison to other Honda vehicles
Articles on the first generation Honda Insight have compared its appearance to that of the 1984–1991 CRX.

In 2010, thirteen years after the end of CRX production, Honda released the CR-Z, regarded as the spiritual successor to the CRX.

Awards
 1984: The Honda CRX is named Motor Trend's "Import Car of the Year"
 1985: The Honda CRX is included in Car and Driver's 10Best
 1988: The Honda CRX is included in Car and Driver's 10Best
 1988: The Honda CRX Si is named Motor Trend's "Import Car of the Year"
 1988: The Honda CRX Si was named Road & Track as "One of the Ten Best Cars"
 1990: The Honda CRX is named Motor Trend's "Import Car of the Year"

Consumer reporter David Horowitz tested the 1984 CRX's fuel economy claim in a "Commercial Challenge" on his TV series Fight Back! Commercials for the CRX claimed it could reach 60 miles per gallon fuel economy; according to Horowitz's test, it bested that figure, reaching 65 miles per gallon, and passed the test.

Safety
In Australia, the 1988–1991 CR-X was assessed in the Used Car Safety Ratings 2006 as providing "significantly worse than average" protection for its occupants in the event of side impact. Both versions of the CR-X got good safety marks (4 and 5 stars) in the NHTSA Crash Test Results for 1997 US NCAP.

The US version of the second generation CR-X employed the use of side impact door beams on some models. These models can be identified by the mounting position of the safety belts. If the belt is mounted in the door, the beams are present. If the belt is mounted in the body, there is no additional reinforcement. 1988 and 1989 HFs along with 1988 Sis and base models have the B-pillar mounted restraints, like all versions sold outside of the US.

United States
The National Highway Traffic Safety Administration (NHTSA) in the United States has determined frontal crash test ratings of Honda CRX of different model years.

Motorsport

Like the Civic, due to the wide availability of parts, the CR-X is popular for motorsport usage. In the United Kingdom, there was a one-make series dedicated to the series 2 of the CR-X which soldiered on a few years after the series 3 was introduced and was popular for showroom stock racing series. Today, the car is popular for use in drag, autocross and road racing events.

Twin-engine CRX
Project Synchronicity Honda CRX was a collaboration between American Honda and Racing Beat to install a second 1.5-liter engine with automatic transmission into the hatchback cargo area. The installation of the second powertrain "took six months and cost $20,000 dollars". Phase Two of the project was to have Racing Beat install two 1.8-liter engines with automatic transmissions from the Honda Accord into Synchronicity. The Honda CRX would be called Super Synchronicity because of the increase of performance from two larger engines. Both Honda Accord 1.8-liter powertrains were fuel injected and upgrades were made to the suspension.  A Mugen body kit and upgraded wheels were also installed.

Convertibles
The R. Straman Company of Costa Mesa, CA converted 310 Honda CRXs into convertibles from 1984 until 1987. The Straman-built CRX Spyder was the cover car on the July 1984 issue of Road & Track'' magazine.

References

External links

  - official library of original press information and "fact books" on all of the CRX series (in Japanese, though contains many images including concept artwork)

CR-X
CR-X
Front-wheel-drive sports cars
Cars introduced in 1983
Hatchbacks
Sport compact cars
1990s cars
Cars discontinued in 1991